Udayraj Hindu Inter College  is one of the oldest inter colleges of Kashipur, Uttarakhand, India. It is located near Nagnath Temple on the Manpur Road.

The College was established by Raja Udai Raj Pratap Singh, from Chand Dynasty of Kumaon through one trust named after his mother.
K. C. Singh Baba, who is the decedent of the Chand Kings is the Chairman of the trust. The first secretary of that trust was Pt. Govind Ballabh Pant, first chief minister of Uttar Pradesh. The land was donated by Raja Udai Pratap Raj Singh. In its early days it was a co-educational college, however after the opening of one Government Girls Inter college at Kashipur, it was converted to a boys' college. It was affiliated to UP board and on constitution of Uttrakhand it is now affiliated to Uttrakhand Board.  udayraj Hindu inter college kashipur has labs such as 
Biology lab, Physics lab, Chemistry lab, social science lab, with qualified teachers.

References 

ATUL KUMAR, et al., (ALL ALUMNI)

Universities and colleges in Uttarakhand
Education in Udham Singh Nagar district
Kashipur, Uttarakhand
Junior colleges in India
Educational institutions established in 1914
1914 establishments in India